opened in Hatsukaichi, Hiroshima Prefecture, Japan in 1996. The collection of some 800 works acquired by the  centres around Modern Japanese Painting, Meissen porcelain, Art Nouveau glass, Qing ceramics, and Satsuma ware of the Bakumatsu and Meiji periods, and includes paintings by Kishida Ryūsei, Renoir, and Van Gogh.

See also

 List of Cultural Properties of Japan - paintings (Hiroshima)
 Hiroshima Prefectural Art Museum
 Itsukushima Jinja

References

External links
  Wood One Museum of Art

Museums in Hiroshima Prefecture
Art museums established in 1996
1996 establishments in Japan
Hatsukaichi, Hiroshima
Art museums and galleries in Japan